The 2018–19 Primera Divisió, also known as Lliga Multisegur Assegurances, was the 24th season of top-tier football in Andorra.

The winner of the league this season earned a place in the preliminary round of the 2019–20 Champions League, and the second-placed club earned a place in the preliminary round of the 2019–20 Europa League.

Teams
FC Ordino earned a place in the Primera Divisió this season by winning the 2017–18 Segona Divisió.

Clubs and locations

Regular season

League table

Results
The eight clubs played each other three times for twenty–one matches each during the regular season.

Championship and relegation round
Records earned in the regular season were taken over to the Championship round and relegation round.

Championship round

Relegation round

Primera Divisió play-offs
The seventh-placed club (third-placed in the relegation round), from the 2018–19 Primera Divisió and the runners-up from the 2018–19 Segona Divisió, played in a two-legged relegation play-off for one place in the 2019–20 Primera Divisió.

CE Carroi promoted to 2019–20 Primera Divisió; FC Lusitanos relegated to 2019–20 Segona Divisió

Season statistics

Regular season top goalscorers

Regular season top goalkeepers

Championship round top goalscorers

Relegation round top goalscorers

See also
 Segona Divisio
 Copa Constitucio

References

External links
  
uefa.com
soccerway.com

Primera Divisió seasons
Andorra
2018–19 in Andorran football